William Hay, 4th Earl of Erroll  (1470 –  9 September 1513), styled as Lord Hay until 1507, was a Scottish peer and soldier. He was killed at the Battle of Flodden.

Biography

William Hay was the son of William Hay, 3rd Earl of Erroll. He had double royal lineage: his grandfather, William Hay, 1st Earl of Erroll was a great-great grandson of King Robert II of Scotland; and his maternal grandfather was James I of Scotland.

He served as the  Lord High Constable of Scotland, a hereditary title that was, after the king, the supreme officer of the Scottish army. He was killed on 9 September 1513 in the Battle of Flodden, near Branxton, Northumberland. He died alongside his younger brother Thomas, King James IV of Scotland and more than a dozen dukes and earls in a decisive English victory.

Marriage and issue

He married Christian Lyon, daughter of John Lyon, 3rd Lord Glamis, and had two children:
William Hay, 5th Earl of Erroll (Errol, Perthshire, Scotland – 28 July 1522 in Edinburgh)
Lady Isabel Hay

He married secondly Margaret Kinloch of Cruvie, widow of Sir James Sandilands, 5th feudal baron of Calder.

Ancestry

References

 

1470 births
1513 deaths
04
15th-century Scottish people
04
Scottish soldiers
Deaths at the Battle of Flodden